Don't Mind may refer to:
 Don't Mind (Kent Jones song)
 Don't Mind (Mary J. Blige song)

See also
 I Don't Mind (disambiguation)